Más de un Camino is the second EP recorded by Mexican-American singer-songwriter Pepe Aguilar.

Más de un Camino reached number 18 on the Billboard Top Latin Albums chart and number ten on the Billboard Regional Mexican Albums chart in the United States. The recording won a Latin Grammy Award for Best Ranchero Album at the 13th Annual Latin Grammy Awards in 2012.

Reception and commercial release 
The recording won a Latin Grammy Award for Best Ranchero Album at the 13th Annual Latin Grammy Awards in 2012. Negociaré con la pena reached number 18 on the Billboard Top Latin Albums chart and number ten on the Billboard Regional Mexican Albums chart in the United States.

Track listing

Charts

References

2012 albums
Spanish-language albums
Ranchera albums
Pepe Aguilar albums
Latin Grammy Award for Best Ranchero/Mariachi Album